Hi Opie! is a Canadian preschool show that premiered on September 1, 2014 on TVOKids and also airs on Knowledge Network and City Saskatchewan.

The series was renewed in 2015 for a second season. Season 2 began airing September 7, 2015 on TVO and City. It premiered on Knowledge Network on September 28, 2015.

The first season was formerly available on Netflix in North America.

Plot
Hi Opie! is a live-action preschool series that follows the social, emotional and intellectual escapades of 5-year-old Opie, a puppet who is the "new kid" in a kindergarten class. Each story contains a simple lesson about personal growth, with a focus on the process of learning through play. In March 2016, it was announced that a sequel series entitled Opie's Home began production in the summer of 2016 and was released in 2017.

Awards

Episodes

Season 1

Season 2

References

External links

Television shows filmed in Toronto
TVO original programming
2014 Canadian television series debuts
2016 Canadian television series endings
Canadian television shows featuring puppetry
Television series by The Jim Henson Company
2010s Canadian children's television series
Canadian preschool education television series
2010s preschool education television series
Television series about children
English-language television shows